The 17th Legislative Assembly of Ontario was in session from December 1, 1926, until September 17, 1929, just prior to the 1929 general election. The majority party was the Ontario Conservative Party led by George Howard Ferguson.

William David Black served as speaker for the assembly.

Members elected to the Assembly

Timeline

External links 
Members in Parliament 17

References 

Terms of the Legislative Assembly of Ontario
1926 establishments in Ontario
1929 disestablishments in Ontario